Rastriya Jana Prajatantrik Party is a political party in Nepal. The party is registered with the Election Commission of Nepal ahead of the 2008 Constituent Assembly election.

References

Political parties in Nepal

ne:राष्ट्रिय जन प्रजातान्त्रिक पार्टी